NGC 4222 is an edge-on spiral galaxy located about 60 million light-years away in the constellation Coma Berenices. It was discovered by astronomer William Herschel on April 8, 1784 and is often misidentified as IC 3087. Despite this, the two galaxies are not interacting.

See also
 List of NGC objects (4001–5000)

References

External links

4222
39308
Coma Berenices
Virgo Cluster
Astronomical objects discovered in 1784
Spiral galaxies
7291